Out of My Province is the third  studio album by New Zealand musician Nadia Reid. It was released on 6 March 2020 under Spacebomb Records.

Critical reception
Out of My Province was met with universal acclaim reviews from critics. At Metacritic, which assigns a weighted average rating out of 100 to reviews from mainstream publications, this release received an average score of 83, based on 8 reviews.

Track listing

Charts

References

2020 albums
Spacebomb Records albums